William McKay (1772–1832) was a Canadian soldier and administrator.

William or Bill McKay may also refer to:

William McKay (footballer), Scottish footballer
William McKay (parliamentary official) (born 1939), British government administrator, Clerk of the House of Commons
William McKay (politician) (1847–1915), Canadian Senator representing Nova Scotia
Bill McKay (footballer, born 1906) (1906–1977), Scottish association footballer
Bill McKay (Australian footballer) (1879–1950), Australian rules footballer
Bill McKay (rugby player) (1921–1997), Irish rugby union player
Billy Mckay, Northern Irish footballer
William Cameron McKay (1824–1893), U.S. Army officer, scout, physician and surgeon

See also
William Mackay (disambiguation)
William McKee (disambiguation)
William McKie (disambiguation)